Ankole Western University is an Anglican institution of higher learning in Uganda. It is owned and administered by the Western Ankole Diocese of the Church of Uganda.

Location
The university is located in the town of Kabwohe, in Sheema District, Western Uganda. The approximate coordinates of the university are:0°34'28.0"S, 30°22'44.0"E (Latitude:-0.574444; Longitude:30.378889).

History
The resolution by the Anglican mission to start a tertiary institution of learning in Western Ankole was made in 2002. It was further resolved that the institution be situated at Kabwohe Hill. Ultimately, the institution would be called Ankole Western University. In order to build up to university status, the institution is named the Ankole Western Institute of Science and Technology.

In December 2005, the institute admitted the first batch of students to study for the Diploma in Education (Primary Education). In January 2006 another batch of students were enrolled to study for the Diploma in Agribusiness.

In November 2007, Ankole applied for a license as a tertiary college of learning. In July 2008, the license was granted and the institute was given authority to award certificates and diplomas in the fields of instruction where it offered courses.

As of October 2009, Ankole Western University has over three hundred students enrolled in various fields of study, including education, business administration, agribusiness, animal health, animal production, guidance & counseling, developmental studies, social work and social administration.

Academics
The academic programs offered at Ankole Western University include the following:

 Diploma courses

 Diploma in Journalism and Mass Communication
 Diploma in Primary Education
 Diploma in Animal Health & Production
 Diploma in Agribusiness
 Diploma in Business Administration
 Diploma in Guidance and Counseling
 Diploma in Development Studies
 Diploma in Social Work and Social Administration
 Diploma in Information Technology
 Diploma in Computer Science
 Diploma in Secretarial Studies

 Certificate course
 Certificate in Agribusiness
 Certificate in Business Administration
 Certificate in Nursery Education
 Certificate in Computer Science
 Certifate in Computer Applications

See also
List of university leaders in Uganda
List of universities in Uganda
Education in Uganda

References

External links
 Ankole Western University Graduates the first Diploma Class
 Ankole Western University Homepage
  Ankole Western University Starts Construction of Shs:3 Billion Science Building
 West Ankole Diocese At A Crossroads Over Location of University Project

Ankole Western University
Educational institutions established in 2005
Sheema District
Ankole sub-region
Western Region, Uganda
2005 establishments in Uganda